Frittelle or fritole are Venetian doughnuts served only during Carnival. Similar to bomboloni, they are round, yeast-risen fried pastries. Frittelle are served in a number of different forms, including Fritelle Veneziane, which are unfilled and have pine nuts and raisins stirred into the dough; as well as several filled varieties. Fillings include pastry cream, zabaione, and occasionally less common fillings such as apple or chocolate custard cream.

In the city of Molfetta located in the Bari province of the Puglia region, frittelle (sometimes spelt frittelli) is used as another name for panzerotti.

See also
 Frittole (doughnut)

Notes

Cuisine of Veneto
Italian doughnuts
Italian pastries
Carnival foods